Aleksandar Simović may refer to:

 Aleksandar Simović (conspirator), co-conspirator in the assassination of Zoran Đinđić
 Aleksandar Simović (footballer), Serbian footballer